William Henry Tracey Campbell Penney Vallange (15 August 1864 – 7 February 1924) was an English cricketer and medical doctor who played for Otago.

Born in England, Vallange spent a few years in Dunedin in the 1880s. He made a single first-class appearance for Otago during the 1886–87 season, against Canterbury. From the opening order, he scored 21 runs in the first innings and, when moved down the order, scored 9 runs in the second. A few weeks earlier he had played for an Otago XXII against the touring Australians, scoring 18 in the first innings when no other Otago batsman reached double figures. In 1886 he also represented Otago against Canterbury at rugby union.

Vallange later studied Medicine at the University of Edinburgh, qualifying as a doctor in 1894. He practised in London.

See also
 List of Otago representative cricketers

References

External links
Henry Vallange at Cricket Archive 

1864 births
1924 deaths
Cricketers from Greater London
New Zealand cricketers
Otago cricketers
Alumni of the University of Edinburgh Medical School
20th-century English medical doctors